The Boxing Tournament at the 2006 South American Games was held in Buenos Aires, Argentina from November 10 to November 15.
0

Medal winners

References
Results

2006 South American Games events
S
2006